Euphorbia spathulata is a species of spurge known by the common names warty spurge and roughpod spurge.

It is native to the Americas, where it is widespread in many habitats.

Description
Euphorbia spathulata is an annual herb not exceeding half a meter in height with oval-shaped leaves one to three centimeters long. The upper stem may be bright to dull red and is hairless.

At the tips of the stems are inflorescences of tiny glandular flowers.

The fruit is a rounded green capsule a few millimeters wide with obvious bumps on the surface. It contains light brown netted seeds.

External links
Jepson Manual Treatment: Euphorbia spathulata
USDA Plants Profile
Euphorbia spathulata —U.C. Photo gallery

spathulata
Flora of North America
Flora of Central America
Flora of South America
Flora of Canada
Flora of the United States
Flora of Mexico
Flora of the Great Lakes region (North America)
Flora of the Great Plains (North America)
Flora of California
Flora of Florida
Flora of Georgia (U.S. state)
Flora of Michigan
Flora of Wisconsin
Flora of the Rocky Mountains
Flora of the Sierra Nevada (United States)
Natural history of the California chaparral and woodlands
Natural history of the California Coast Ranges
Natural history of the Central Valley (California)
Flora without expected TNC conservation status